Frédéric Marin-Cudraz (born 7 January 1974, in Albertville) is a retired French alpine skier, who competed in the 1998 Winter Olympics.

External links
 

1974 births
Living people
French male alpine skiers
Olympic alpine skiers of France
Alpine skiers at the 1998 Winter Olympics
Sportspeople from Albertville